Redfield is an area situated in East Bristol though it is represented in Westminster as part of the Bristol West constituency. It includes the stretch of Church Road (A420) from Verrier Road to the western boundary of St George's Green, Victorian-era landscaped parkland. It is adjacent to the neighbourhoods of  Barton Hill and Russell Town to the South, St George to the East, Whitehall to the North and Lawrence Hill to the West and Pile Marsh to the South-East.

Population

Bristol City Council identifies that the area commonly known as Redfield consists of two Lower Super Output Areas ("LSOAs"): Church Road and Redfield.  The 2008 Ward Profiles published by Bristol City Council rank the two LSOAs as 112th and 111th (respectively) out of 252 most deprived areas in Bristol (no.1 being the most deprived). The total population for the Redfield area is 2,350 and data available suggests that the predominant age group is 16–44 years comprising 55% of the total population. Redfield falls into two Bristol wards: Easton and St George West. The area is ethnically diverse with 8.2% of the population being from Black and Minority Ethnic groups.

Community involvement

The 2003 Redfield Action Plan outlines a number of measures to improve social and economic conditions in Redfield and its locale.  Community at Heart was set up to oversee implementation of the programme in Redfield, Barton Hill and The Dings.
Recently the relatively low cost of housing and proximity to the city centre has made the area attractive to young couples and professionals moving to Bristol from London and the south-east.

Leisure and entertainment

To the east of the area lies St George Park, an elegant Victorian suburban park.
Redfest is an independent arts and music festival seeking to bring music, film, cabaret, comedy, animation, graffiti, photography, art and fun to community of Redfield.

Redfest is run by a group of volunteers from the local community and is entirely reliant on public donations, support and sponsorship from local businesses and grant funding where available.

Transport

Recent investment in public transport infrastructure can be witnessed on Church Road as part of the second showcase bus route in Bristol.  The scheme is a collaboration between Bristol City Council and First, one of the city's bus transport providers, designed to provide improvements to existing services and offer more reliable, convenient and safe alternatives to travelling by car.  The showcase bus route runs from the City Centre out to the suburbs of Kingswood and Hanham.

The nearby Lawrence Hill railway station serves the Redfield population and provides an easy access point to the Severn Beach Line running from Bristol Temple Meads railway station out to Severn Beach, the line has been listed among Thomas Cook's most favoured attractions for its scenic route along the River Avon and River Severn.

The Bristol & Bath Railway Path, a 13-mile asphalt motor-vehicle-free route between the cities of Bristol and Bath, starts just west of Redfield at Lawrence Hill and has several entrance points along its route just north of the area.

Notes

Areas of Bristol